Great Expectations is an 1860 novel by Charles Dickens.

Great Expectations may also refer to:

Adaptations of the Dickens novel 
 Great Expectations (1917 film), a silent, black-and-white version starring Jack Pickford as Pip
 Great Expectations (1934 film), a Hollywood production directed by Stuart Walker
 Great Expectations (1946 film), a British film directed by David Lean
 Great Expectations (1974 film), a television version, directed by Joseph Hardy
Great Expectations (musical), a 1975 stage musical by Cyril Ornadel and Hal Shaper
 Great Expectations (1967 TV series), a 1967 television serialisation, directed by Alan Bridges
 Great Expectations (1981 TV series), a BBC serialisation, starring Graham McGrath as young Pip
 Great Expectations (1989 TV series), a 1989 British serialisation, directed by Kevin Connor
 Great Expectations (1998 film), a Hollywood production directed by Alfonso Cuarón
 Great Expectations (1999 film), a BBC production, directed by Julian Jarrold
 Great Expectations (2011 TV series), a BBC serialization, featuring Gillian Anderson as Miss Havisham
 Great Expectations (2012 film), a British film directed by Mike Newell
 Great Expectations (2023 TV series), a 2023 television serialisation, developed by Steven Knight
 Great Expectations, a 1993 West End musical with music by Mike Read
 Great Expectations, a 1983 novel by Kathy Acker, the opening of which is a plagiarization (though re-written) of Dickens's novel

Music 
 Great Expectations, a 1970 album by Kiki Dee
 Great Expectations (album), a 1992 album by Tasmin Archer
 Great Expectations, a 2008 album by Michael Rose
 "Great Expectations", a song by Miles Davis from his 1974 album Big Fun
 "Great Expectations", a song by Eric Carmen from his eponymous 1975 album Eric Carmen
 "Great Expectations", a song by Kiss from their 1976 album Destroyer
 "Great Expectations", a song by The Men They Couldn't Hang from their 1990 album The Domino Club
 "Great Expectations", a song by Cat Power from her 1995 album Dear Sir
 "Great Expectations", a song by Jurassic 5 from their 2000 album Quality Control (album)
 "Great Expectations", a song by Elbow from their 2005 album Leaders of the Free World
 "Great Expectations", a song by The Gaslight Anthem from their 2008 album The '59 Sound
 "Great Expectations", a song by Porcupine Tree from their 2009 album The Incident
 "Great Expectations", a song by Diggy Simmons featuring Bei Maejor from his 2010 mixtape, Airborne

Other uses 
 Great Expectations (2007 film), a 2007 documentary by Jesper Wachtmeister
 Great Expectations (2018 TV series), a 2018 Chinese television series
 Great Expectations (company), established in 1987 as an SEC rule 12b-2 shell company in the medical field
 "Great Expectations" (Modern Family), an episode of the television series Modern Family
 "Great Expectations" (Grey's Anatomy), an episode of the television series Grey's Anatomy
 MV Great Expectations, a ferry used on the Hythe ferry service in Southampton, England
 Pip (South Park), also known as "Great Expectations", an episode of the American animated series South Park which parodies Dickens' novel